Devil's Bridge is a name applied to many bridges.

Devil's Bridge, Ceredigion, village named after a local bridge in Wales
Devil's Bridge railway station, serving this village.
Devil's Bridge, Antigua and Barbuda, a natural arch in Antigua
a natural bridge on the tidal island of Worm's Head, Rhossili, Wales
Devil's Bridge, a novel by Linda Fairstein